The 47th Annual Japan Record Awards took place at the New National Theatre in Shibuya, Tokyo, on December 31, 2005, starting at 6:00PM JST. The primary ceremonies were televised in Japan on TBS.

Awards winners 
Japan Record Award: 
Kumi Koda for Butterfly
Best Vocalist:
Kaori Mizumori
Best New Artist:
AAA
Best Album:
Ketsumeishi for Ketsunopolis4

See also 
56th NHK Kōhaku Uta Gassen

External links
Official Website.
Complete list of all winners.

Japan Record Awards
Japan Record Awards
Japan Record Awards
Japan Record Awards
2005